The Secret Daughter: Songs from the Original TV Series is the first individual soundtrack album by Australian recording artist Jessica Mauboy, featuring music used in the television series of the same name, which stars Mauboy. The 17-track album includes five original songs by Mauboy along with covers of past and contemporary songs. The album debuted atop the ARIA Albums Chart and became Mauboy's first individual number-one album. She also became the first indigenous artist to debut at number one on that chart.

The Secret Daughter: Songs from the Original TV Series was nominated for Best Original Soundtrack, Cast or Show Album at the 2017 ARIA Music Awards.

Singles
Original track "Risk It" was released as the lead single through the album's iTunes pre-order on 11 August 2016. "Risk It" was used in a commercial for The Secret Daughter television series, and a music video was released in September.

A cover version of Avicii's "Wake Me Up" was released in October 2016. "Wake Me Up" peaked at number 34 on the ARIA Singles Chart and was the only song from the album that charted.

A cover versìon of Rihanna's Diamonds" was released as a promotional single in March 2017, and is one of additional tracks included on the album's re-released secret edition.

Reception

David from auspOp said "While there’s nothing innovative about what’s on offer here, the song choices work with her voice quite well.
Her cover of "Photograph" sends shivers down my spine, especially when you take the context of the lyrics and apply them to the storyline of the show. It’s not the most exciting release from Jess, but there’s still time left this year for a set of originals."

Track listing

Charts

Weekly charts

Year-end charts

Certifications

See also
 List of number-one albums of 2016 (Australia)

Release history

References

Jessica Mauboy albums
2016 soundtrack albums
Sony Music Australia albums
Soundtracks by Australian artists